The Vorberge ("fore-hills" or "foothills") are a ridge, up to  high, in the Lower Saxon Hills and within the district of  Hildesheim in the German state of Lower Saxony. Together with the Sieben Berge and the Sackwald, the Vorberge belong to the geological formation of the Sackmulde.

Geography 
The ridge of Vorberge is located in the eastern edge of the Leine Uplands in the Lower Saxon Hills. It lies between the town of Alfeld on the River Leine to the southwest and Sibbesse on the Alme to the north.

The Vorberge is surrounded by other uplands: the Hildesheim Forest to the north, the Sauberge to the east-northeast, Harplage to the east-southeast, the Heber to the southeast, the Sackwald to the south and the Sieben Berge to the west. Topographically, it transitions seamlessly to the last named range. Several streams rise within and on the edge of the Vorberge whose waters sooner or later find their way into the westward-flowing Leine or the northeastwards- running Innerste; it thus forms a watershed between the two rivers. 

The unsettled hills of the Vorberge are crossed by several forest tracks and hiking trails which enable visitors to explored the wooded landscape. It is easily reached on the winding Landesstraße L 485 country road that branches off the B 3 in Alfeld, which runs northeast linking Alfeld with Sibbesse and with Hildesheim further to the north.

Hills 
The hills of the Vorberge include the following (heights in metres above sea level (NN)): 
 Hainberg (353.0 m) – west-southwest of Sibbesse
 Bremberg (352.6 m; also called the Brahmberg) – south-southwest of Sibbesse
 Sommerberg (335 m) – south of Sibbesse
 Wernershöhe (329 m) – southwest of Wrisbergholzen, part of Westfeld - with a communications tower
 Heiligenholzberg (ca. 305 m) – west of Adenstedt
 Hainholzberg (ca. 300 m) – southwest of Adenstedt on the boundary with the Sackwald
 Hettberg (327 m) – southwest of Sibbesse
 Roseberg (263 m) – northeast of Langenholzen, part of Alfeld

Streams 
Amongst the streams in and around the Vorberge are the: 
 Alme, rises in the north Vorberge, western tributary of the Riehe
 Despe, passes the Vorberge to the north running from east to west; eastern tributary of the Leine
 Hahmbach, rises in the north-northwestern part of the Vorberge on the boundary with the Sieben Berge, southern tributary of the Despe
 Riehe, passes the Vorberge to the east running from south to north; southwestern tributary of the Lamme

Settlements 
The villages on the edge of the Vorberge include: 
 Adenstedt in the catchment area of the Riehe, southeast of the Vorberge
 Almstedt on the Alme, east of the Vorberge
 Alfeld on the Leine, southwest of the Vorberge
 Sibbesse in the catchment area of the Despe, north of the Vorberge
 Westfeld in the catchment area of the Alme, northeast of the Vorberge

Places of interest 

References and footnotes 

Hill ranges of Lower Saxony
Forests and woodlands of Lower Saxony
Natural regions of the Weser-Leine Uplands